Eric Lawrence Lively (né Brown; born July 31, 1981) is an American actor. He played the role of Andy Evans in Speak (2004), Carey Bell in So Weird (1999–2001), and Mark Wayland in The L Word (2005).

Early life
Eric Lawrence Lively was born in Atlanta, Georgia. He has a sister, actress Blake Lively, half-sisters Lori and Robyn Lively, and a half-brother, Jason Lively, who played Rusty in National Lampoon's European Vacation. He is the son of actor Ernie Lively (né Ernest Wilson Brown Jr.) and talent manager Elaine Lively (née McAlpin). All of his four siblings have been in the entertainment industry.

Career

Lively's first film was as a baby in the 1983 film Brainstorm. After graduating from high school, Lively moved to New York City to study photography, his first passion. He studied photography at Parsons The New School for Design in New York City. At one time, he was an Abercrombie and Fitch model.

He guest starred on an episode of Full House at age 13, where he played Stephanie Tanner's first boyfriend. He had a role in American Pie (1999). He followed this up on the television series So Weird, on which he played Carey Bell from 2000 to 2001. He learned to play the guitar for his character on So Weird. Lively then became a cast member of the short-lived 2003 Norm Macdonald series A Minute With Stan Hooper. In 2004 he acted in Speak with Kristen Stewart. In 2005, Lively was offered two different television roles – on 24 and The L Word. He took the role on The L Word as documentary filmmaker Mark Wayland. He chose a recurring role on The L Word over a regular role on 24 because he felt the subject matter was more important. He was part of the cast of the WB series Modern Men from March until May 2006. He was the main character in The Butterfly Effect 2 in 2006. 

Lively played the president's son, Roger Taylor, in 24: Redemption, a television film prequel to the seventh season of 24.

He appeared as Pink's on-screen boyfriend in her music video "Please Don't Leave Me" in 2009, with stuntman Justin Sundquist serving as his stunt double. In 2012, he guest starred in the Lifetime series The Client List. In 2013 Lively played in A Madea Christmas as Conner.

Filmography

References

External links
 

1981 births
20th-century American male actors
21st-century American male actors
American male child actors
American male film actors
Male models from Georgia (U.S. state)
American male television actors
Living people
Male actors from Atlanta
Parsons School of Design alumni
Eric